The Theraphosinae are a large subfamily of Mygalomorphae spiders in the family Theraphosidae found in the Neotropical realm.

Genera 
The subfamily Theraphosinae includes these genera:

 Acanthoscurria
 Aenigmarachne
 Aphonopelma
 Bonnetina
 Brachypelma
 Bumba (formerly Maraca)
 Chromatopelma
 Citharacanthus
 Clavopelma
 Crassicrus
 Cyclosternum
 Cyriocosmus
 Cyrtopholis
 Euathlus
 Eupalaestrus
 Grammostola
 Hapalopus
 Hapalotremus
 Hemirrhagus
 Homoeomma
 Lasiodora
 Lasiodorides
 Magulla
 Megaphobema
 Melloleitaoina
 Metriopelma
 Munduruku
 Neostenotarsus
 Nesipelma
 Nhandu
 Ozopactus
 Pamphobeteus
 Paraphysa
 Phormictopus
 Plesiopelma
 Proshapalopus
 Pseudhapalopus
 Reversopelma
 Schizopelma
 Sericopelma
 Sphaerobothria
 Stichoplastoris
 Theraphosa
 Thrixopelma
 Tmesiphantes
 Vitalius
 Xenesthis

References 

 ; ;  2011: Revalidation of Pterinopelma Pocock 1901 with description of a new species and the female of Pterinopelma vitiosum (Keyserling 1891) (Araneae: Theraphosidae: Theraphosinae). Zootaxa, 2814: 1–18. Preview
 ;  2010: Agnostopelma: a new genus of tarantula without a scopula on leg IV (Araneae: Theraphosidae: Theraphosinae). Journal of arachnology, 38(1): 104–112.

External links 

Theraphosidae
Spider subfamilies